Carlos Reed (19 March 1917 – 1998) was a Chilean swimmer. He competed in the men's 200 metre breaststroke at the 1936 Summer Olympics.

References

External links
 

1917 births
1998 deaths
Chilean male breaststroke swimmers
Olympic swimmers of Chile
Swimmers at the 1936 Summer Olympics
Place of birth missing
20th-century Chilean people